Alfred Holt and Company, trading as Blue Funnel Line, was a UK shipping company that was founded in 1866 and operated merchant ships for 122 years. It was one of the UK's larger shipowning and operating companies, and as such had a significant role in the country's overseas trade and in the First and Second World Wars.

Its seafarers later went to fill various roles in the British maritime shore based establishment, including Malcolm Machlachlan, a lecturer in Glasgow and a popular author of books on Maritime business.

History

Foundation and expansion
Alfred Holt founded the business on 16 January 1866.
The main operating subsidiary was the Ocean Steam Ship Company, which owned and operated the majority of the company's vessels.

A Dutch subsidiary, the Nederlandsche Stoomvaart Maatschappij Oceaan, was founded in 1891, as was the East India Ocean Steam Ship Company, operated from Singapore. This latter was sold in 1899 to Norddeutscher Lloyd. The company acquired the competing China Mutual Steam Navigation Company in 1902, keeping it as a subsidiary company but operating it as part of Blue Funnel Line. The company's ships connected the major ports of Shanghai and Hong Kong to Liverpool. The ship's crews were Chinese as well as European. As a consequence, some Chinese seamen settled in Liverpool from the 1860s to found the oldest Chinese community in Europe.

Ships of the Blue Funnel fleet all had names from classical Greek legend or history. The majority were cargo ships, but most of the Ocean SS Co cargo ships also had capacity for a few passengers. The line also had a small number of purely passenger vessels.

Passenger accommodations were for first class only and seven cargo holds, one and a 'tween decks space fitted for refrigerated meat, dairy and fruit cargoes, provided accommodation of the largest consignments.

In the 1920s, Blue Funnel became the first British shipping company to employ a woman marine engineer. These were two of the first new ships built for Blue Funnel to replace its Second World War losses.

The company expanded in 1937 through acquisition of the Glen Line in 1935, that provided cargo and passenger service to the Far East from eastern English ports such as London. The overall managing director, C. E. Wurtzburg, brought Herbert Gladstone McDavid to London from the company's Liverpool office as director of the new acquisition and profits increased. Eight new Glenearn class ships were ordered, four from UK shipyards and four from abroad but not all were delivered when the Second World War started.

Outward Bound
The first Outward Bound school was opened in Aberdyfi, Wales in 1941 with the support of the Blue Funnel Line. Outward Bound's founding mission was to improve the survival chances of young seamen after their ships were torpedoed in the mid-Atlantic.

Captain JF "Freddy" Fuller of the Blue Funnel Line took over the leadership of the Aberdyfi school in 1942 and served the Outward Bound movement as senior warden until 1971. Fuller was seconded following wartime experience during the Battle of the Atlantic of surviving two successive U-boat attacks and commanding an open lifeboat in the Atlantic Ocean for 35 days without losing a single member of the crew.

After the World Wars

Blue Funnel lost 16 ships in the First World War and 30 in the Second. After each war it restored its fleet with new ships. After the Second War it regained tonnage rapidly by buying six Victory ships from the United States Maritime Commission in 1946 and eight "Sam-" ships from the Ministry of War Transport in 1947. Six of the eight new ships ordered by Glen Line in 1938 were reacquired, resulting in a fleet of 15 ships by September 1948. The twice-monthly fast service and a slower secondary service to the Far East resumed.

Two Blue Funnel ships, Agapenor and Melampus were trapped by the Six-Day War of 1967 and became part of the Yellow Fleet in the Great Bitter Lake, remaining there until 1975.

Decline

From 1947 to 1970, as Britain's empire began to shrink, so did its trade. Simultaneously, companies from other parts of the world began to operate more competitively. Cabotage regulations prevented British flag companies from trading on routes that were previously their monopolies. Several factors resulted in a decreased number in the Blue Funnel's fleet.

The company finally came to an end in 1988 when Ocean Group withdrew from the Barber Blue Sea Service, its last shipping line.

Legacy
The Merseyside Maritime Museum Archive and Library holds the company archive.

See also

References

Bibliography

Links

The Blue Funnel Line  1866 - 1986 (archived)
Alfred Holt & Co The Blue Funnel Line (archived)
kbolton.btinternet.co.uk
 – 1913 brochure for Nestor and Ulysses, with period interior photographs

1866 establishments in England
1988 disestablishments in England
British companies established in 1966
British companies disestablished in 1988
Defunct companies based in Liverpool
Defunct shipping companies of the United Kingdom
Holt family
Outward Bound
Transport companies established in 1966
Transport companies disestablished in 1988